The Metro K Line Northern Extension is a project planning a Los Angeles Metro Rail light rail transit corridor extension connecting Expo/Crenshaw station to Hollywood/Highland station in Hollywood. The corridor is a north-to-south route along mostly densely populated areas of the Los Angeles Basin; it would be operated as part of the K Line. The Los Angeles County Metropolitan Transportation Authority (Metro) is prioritizing the project along with pressure from the West Hollywood residents. Construction is slated to start in 2041 and begin service by 2047 unless means to accelerate the project are found.

Overview
The Los Angeles County Metropolitan Transportation Authority (Metro) budgeted $2.33 billion from Measure M. The Crenshaw/LAX corridor Line was a corridor designated for public transit. It became a light rail line between the C Line and the E Line, with planned connections to LAX. After almost ten years of construction, the K Line, as it was named, opened in 2022. A northern extension could connect with regional job centers and tourist destinations, such as Cedars-Sinai Medical Center, Beverly Center, The Grove, Farmers Market shopping area, and LACMA. The West Hollywood areas are also in the projected routes, Melrose and the Sunset Strip within walking distance.

Original Planning
The original plans for the Crenshaw Corridor project connected Wilshire Blvd to LAX.  However, during the environmental review, Metro determined that if LRT were selected as the preferred mode, the cost for the entire route would exceed the project budget. In December 2009, the Metro Board decided on LRT as the preferred mode; as a result, the part of the corridor north of Exposition Boulevard was deferred until funds became available. This segment can be considered a "Phase Two" extension of the original line.

Any Phase Two extension would be expected to connect to the D Line, the first phase of which is currently under construction as part of the Purple Line Extension project.

In May 2009, Metro released a report on the feasibility of an extension north to Wilshire Boulevard.  It first screened two routes—one to Wilshire/La Brea, and another to Wilshire/Crenshaw. Through this screening, staff concluded that Wilshire/La Brea station would be more cost-effective and compatible with land uses and plans along it. Specifically, the report cited the following advantages of the La Brea route over the Crenshaw route:

 Greater residential and job density,
 Supportive land uses for a high-capacity subway,
 Stronger regional potential to link this corridor northward towards Hollywood in the future,
 Strong community support in the Hancock Park area and
 Fewer geotechnical soil impacts compared to the Hydrogen sulfide soil along Crenshaw Blvd north of Pico Boulevard.

In October 2010, the Metro Board voted to eliminate the Wilshire/Crenshaw station from the D Line Subway Extension project for similar reasons.

The 3.5-mile Wilshire/La Brea route heads north on Crenshaw to Venice, west on Venice to San Vicente, continuing northwest on San Vicente to La Brea, and then north on La Brea to Wilshire.  It has three possible stations: Crenshaw/Adams (optional), Pico/San Vicente, and Wilshire/La Brea.

The feasibility report also allowed for two possible branches/extensions along La Brea Ave, Fairfax Ave, La Cienega Blvd, or San Vicente Blvd heading north of Wilshire into West Hollywood and/or Hollywood.

In November 2010, Metro staff produced an initial review of the feasibility of studying a new transit corridor to connect the Crenshaw Corridor to West Hollywood and/or Hollywood.

In May 2014, the West Hollywood City Council considered a proposal by Council members John Heilman and Jeffrey Prang to engage a lobbyist to promote the need for Metro rail services in West Hollywood. The Heilman/Prang proposal notes that  "former Los Angeles Mayor Antonio Villaraigosa assured West Hollywood representatives that West Hollywood would be 'next in line.'" In 2015, the West Hollywood City Council launched the West Hollywood Advocates for Metro Rail (WHAM) as part of a campaign to win grassroots support for a Metro rail extension into the city.

In September 2016, in a letter to West Hollywood City Council member Lindsey Horvath, Metro CEO Phil Washington outlined several steps Metro is taking to make the Crenshaw/LAX northern extension "shovel ready" should county voters approve Measure M, a countywide ballot measure adding new transit projects and expediting others previously approved under Measure R.

Connection to Phase One
The final design of "Phase One" (the original project line south of Exposition Blvd to LAX) would determine how the Phase Two project could or would connect to Phase One. The original locally preferred alternative (LPA) for the Crenshaw/LAX Line from the draft environmental impact study (Draft EIS/EIR) specified an at-grade station at the Phase One Expo/Crenshaw terminus, with the Leimert Park tunnel ending several blocks south of that, near 39th Street.  If Phase One were built per the LPA, then Phase Two would require the building of a new tunnel with a connection near 39th Street. This would need the north end of the Leimert Park tunnel to be outfitted with knockout panels to allow for the possible future extension north.

Metro also studied "Design Option 6" for Phase One, which would extend the Leimert Park tunnel north to the line's northern terminus at Exposition, with an underground station at Crenshaw/Exposition. This design option was selected so that Phase Two can connect to Phase One directly at the Crenshaw/Exposition station's tunnels.  This design option increased the cost of the original Phase One project by $236 million.

Proposed routes
In July 2018, Metro released its initial set of rail concepts and rail alternatives for the corridor. Conducted by AECOM.

Initial alternatives analysis
The July 2018 concepts released by Metro included five alternative plans for study. These included different alignments but the same mode, light rail, as Phase One of the Crenshaw-LAX Line was currently under construction as light rail. Of the original five, a "Vermont Route" option was dropped in October 2019 due to public comments. A hybrid San Vicente option was added at the same time. On August 17, 2020, Metro recommended three final alignments for environmental analysis and advanced conceptual engineering. The current three alternatives considered are all south to north routes:

The following table shows all potential metro stations and the alternatives for which they apply:

Advocacy 
The city council approved a resolution in May 2018 to expedite its environmental study to speed up the approval process with Metro. Metro's 2018 budget included $500,000 to begin the draft environmental study for the extension project. Residents created the West Hollywood Advocates for Metro Rail to advocate a new LRT or HRT thru Santa Monica boulevard. Los Angeles City Council president Herb Wesson wrote an op-ed piece in the LA Times advocating acceleration of the project. Los Angeles local congressional representative Adam Schiff also voiced his support for acceleration in a letter to metro CEO in March 2019.

References

External links 
 Measure R
 Crenshaw Northern Extension Project

Transportation in Los Angeles
Los Angeles County Metropolitan Transportation Authority
Los Angeles Metro Rail projects
Public transportation in Los Angeles
Public transportation in Los Angeles County, California
Santa Monica Mountains
Proposed railway lines in California
2047